Revie Sorey (born September 1953) is a former professional American football player who played offensive guard for nine seasons in the National Football League (NFL) with the Chicago Bears.

Revie suffered a stroke in March 2012.

References

1953 births
Living people
American football offensive guards
Chicago Bears players
Illinois Fighting Illini football players
Sportspeople from Brooklyn
Players of American football from New York City